Paroecus is a genus of beetles in the family Cerambycidae, containing the following species:

 Paroecus celebensis (Thomson, 1857)
 Paroecus charpentierae Villiers, 1971
 Paroecus rigidus Bates, 1863

References

Acanthocinini